Isabel Pérez Montalbán (born 1964 in Córdoba, Andalusia) is a Spanish poet. She's a member of the so-called Conscience poetry group.

She studied to be a teacher and also learnt media studies. She currently lives in Málaga, and has taken part in several literature festivals like the Week of Poetry of Barcelona in 2007.

Awards and prizes 
Prize Young Literature of City of Málaga, 1992 (No es precisa la muerte)
Prize Barcarola, 1995 (Puente levadizo)
Prize Leonor, 2000 (Los muertos nómadas)

Poetry books
 No es precisa la muerte (Málaga, 1992).
 Pueblo nómada (Málaga, 1995).
 Fuegos japoneses en la bahía (Málaga, 1996)
 Puente levadizo (Albacete, 1996)
 Cartas de amor de un comunista (Valencia, 2000)
 Los muertos nómadas (Soria, 2001)
 De la nieve embrionaria (Montilla, 2002).
 El frío proletario (Málaga, 2002).
 Siberia propia (Madrid, 2007)

References

External links 
 Poems by Isabel Pérez Montalbán

1964 births
Living people
People from Córdoba, Spain
20th-century Spanish poets
21st-century Spanish poets
Spanish women poets
Writers from Andalusia
20th-century Spanish women writers
21st-century Spanish women writers